was the second shōgun of the Ashikaga shogunate who reigned from 1358 to 1367 during the Muromachi period of Japan. Yoshiakira was the son of the founder and first shōgun of the Muromachi shogunate, Ashikaga Takauji. His mother was Akahashi Tōshi (赤橋登子), also known as Hōjō Nariko.

His childhood name was Senjuō. He spent his childhood in Kamakura as a hostage of the Hōjō clan. His father Takauji joined forces with the banished Emperor Go-Daigo. Go-Daigo revolted against the Kamakura shogunate in the Kenmu Restoration. Yoshiakira assisted Nitta Yoshisada (1301–1338) in his attack on the Kamakura shogunate.

In 1349, an internal disturbance of the government caused Yoshiakira to be called back to Kyoto, where he found himself named as Takauji's heir.  On 5 April 1352, Loyalist forces led by Kitabatake Akiyoshi, Kusunoki Masanori and Chigusa Akitsune occupied Kyoto for 20 days before Yoshiakira was able to retake the city. Loyalist forces led by Masanori and Yamana Tokiuji captured Kyoto again in July 1353, but were repulsed by Yoshiakira in August. In January 1355, Loyalist forces led by Momonoi, Tadafuyu, and Yamana captured Kyoto again. However, Kyoto was recaptured on 25 April by Takauji and Yoshiakira's combined forces. Yoshiakira succeeded his father Takauji as Sei-i Taishōgun after his death in 1358.

Notable events 
Takauji died in 1358, his son Yoshiakira is then appointed shōgun, which leads to dissention and defections in shogunate. In 1362, Hosokawa Kiyouji and Kusunoki Masanori attack Kyoto, Yoshiakira flees, but regains the capital in twenty days. Later, Emperor Go-Daigo's son, Prince Kaneyoshi (also known as Kanenaga, leader of Ashikaga clan's archrival court) gains control of Kyushu in 1365. Yoshiakira falls ill in 1367 and cedes his position to his son.

Some months after his death he was succeeded by his son Ashikaga Yoshimitsu, who became the third shōgun in 1368. Yoshiakira was posthumously named , and his grave is at Tōji-in, Kyoto, at the same site as his father's grave.

Family
Parents:
 Father: Ashikaga Takauji (足利 尊氏, August 18, 1305 – June 7, 1358)
 Mother: Akahashi Toshi (赤橋 登子; 1306– 4 May 1365)
Consort and issue:
 Wife: Shibukawa Koshi (澀川幸子; 1332–1392)
Son: Senju-ō (千寿王)
 Concubine: Ki no Yoshiko (纪良子; 1336–1413)
 Son: Ashikaga Yoshimitsu (足利 義満, September 25, 1358 – May 31, 1408)
 Son:  Ashikaga Mitsukaira (足利滿詮;  6 July 1364 – 29 June 1418)
 Son: Seiso (清祖)

Eras of Yoshiakira's bakufu
The years in which Yoshiakira was shōgun are more specifically identified by more than one era name or nengō.

Nanboku-chō southern court
Eras as reckoned by legitimate Court (as determined by Meiji rescript):
 Shōhei (1346–1370)
Nanboku-chō northern Court
Eras as reckoned by pretender Court (as determined by Meiji rescript):
 Enbun (1356–1361)
 Kōan  (1361–1362)
 Jōji  (1362–1368)

See also 
Ashikaga Tadayoshi, paternal uncle of Ashikaga Yoshiakira

References

Sources 
 Ackroyd, Joyce I. (1982) Lessons from History: the Tokushi Yoron. Brisbane: University of Queensland Press.  ;  OCLC 7574544
 Sansom, George Bailey (1961).  A History of Japan: 1334–1615. Stanford: Stanford University Press. ; 
 Titsingh, Isaac. (1834). Nihon Ōdai Ichiran; ou,  Annales des empereurs du Japon.  Paris: Royal Asiatic Society, Oriental Translation Fund of Great Britain and Ireland. OCLC 585069

Ashikaga Yoshiakira
Ashikaga Yoshiakira
14th-century Japanese people
14th-century shōguns
Ashikaga shōguns
Ashikaga clan